The Cleverest is the Russian-Ukrainian version of the British Game show Britain's Brainiest Kid.

It was the winner of the TV contest TEFI. It was hosted by Tina Kandelaki (from 2003 to 2012), Lyudmila Dobrovolskaya (in 2013). It was first aired on March 8, 2003. The last episode aired on June 23, 2013.

"The Cleverest’s Club" 

It combines the best players of the telecast. The club credited the contestants showed most knowledge level in the current season and scored the most points. The club is divided into leagues: junior (6 and 7 grades), senior (8, 9 and 10 grades) and gold (11th grade and students). 48 persons are in each league (except for seasons when a new league grows).

Rules 
The game consisted of three rounds.

Round 1 
Twelve players are asked questions with four answer variants and only one answer is correct. The goal is to answer to the greatest number of questions correctly. The number of asking questions is 18 (12 questions were asked up to summer of 2004). The six semi-finalists are identified in Round 1 (up to the summer of 2004 three players was identified and two first rounds were with different players). Additional questions are asked if it is impossible to identify six best players. Players who are in Round 2 on the major questions, are having not been answering them. After each additional question the check is to know whether is another leaders determined or not. It may be asked not more than six additional questions. 
If six players aren't determined after additional questions are asked, then additional contest is between players who are in a tournament table almost closer to moving the next round (so called ‘the pursuiting group’).

Additional contest 
Four words are given which the player must relate to four categories, for example "Capitals and countries".

"The decipheter" 
Six players scored the small points in Round 1 are moving to Round 2. To determine the right order of answers players have put in Rounds 2 and 3, first «The Decipheter» is held. The Decipheter is the task in which players are offered to guess a word deciphered by an alphanumeric code where each word is replaced by the corresponding number in the T9 system. The ‘Ё’, ‘Й’ and ‘Ъ’ letters aren't using in the decipherer. The earlier player is doing the task, the earlier he will answer the questions in Round 2, and the better his situation will be when he selects any category to play the Round 2. Contestant has a right to select the game button for him in Round 3.

A key for the decipherer:

Round 2 
Round 2 is playing with the two circles. Each of six players must choose a topic in the second circle that he would select to answer. The number of topics are 12 (six topics for two circles). If the topic was played by player, then another players will no longer choose it. Player must answer to maximum number of questions correctly in one minute. One point is added to the right answer. Up to 25 questions may be asked in one minute and thus player is able to score 50 points in two circles. Your quick reaction is needed here when you answer to the question. Players are selecting the topic successively according to the «Decipherer» contest results. During first circle of Round 2 the host usually asks her questions to player about his life and point of view on all sorts of his problem probably to know the player closer. Three players scored the greatest number of points are moving to the final game.

If it is impossible to determine three leaders, for example: several players divide the same place leading to the final game, then the same additional contest is playing between these players that was played in Round 1.

The final 
The «Decipherer» determines that how players are moving in Round 3. Player standing for the red button, after player answers standing for a yellow button and then three player standing for the blue button.

If a player answers correctly, he earns points and square is coloring to player's button colour. If he answers incorrectly, then the square isn't changing its colour and he can choose it again (but another answer will be asked). If player colored his five buttons vertically, horizontally or diagonally, then he earns bonus five points. This bonus is in one game only. Cells on the scoreboard are allocated so that five in a row at least contain exact one «three-point» and «one-point» questions.

Each player is asked nine questions. Player scored the greatest number of points wins. The game may be over early even if no one has a chance to beat the leader. If one leader was not determined after nine circles played, then questions continue to be asked until questions are on the board. In this case if the winner isn't determined, then additional contest held.

Closure 
On December 25, 2012, an administration of STS Channel announced the telecast was closed "due to the change in fiscal policy of channel".

Half a year later it was closed in Ukraine as well. Last episode was aired on June 23, 2013.

Reglament of the season 
According to the results of the semifinal games of last season (according to the rating of points scored) a certain number of players is eliminated, which must defend their membership in the eliminating stages. The number of eliminated players in eliminating stages equal to the number of eliminating games of next season multiplied by three. Also players who were selected on the game, are competing there. Three players are selected to the club from each eliminating game. Club members compete in semifinal games. Four semifinal games held determining players for the grand final. Three players of each semifinal go there. The grand final is the final game of the season. The winner of grand final becomes the champion of the season.

Awards 
This game won the TEFI contest in 2004 in nominating children's program.

It received the award «Teletriumph» in 2008–2009.

It won the TEFI contest in 2009 in nominating «Telecast».

Winners of regular championships 
 2003 season
 Major League: Champion George Moloschenkov (Moscow, Russia).
 Winter-spring season of 2004. 
 Junior League: Champion Marina Mintsikovskaya (Kyiv, Ukraine).
 Autumn-winter season of 2004.
 Junior League: Champion Andrey Ovsyannikov (Mirgorod, Ukraine). 
 Major League: Georgy Moloschenkov (Moscow, Russia).
 Winter-spring season of 2005. 
 Junior League: Champion Alexander Vetchinov (Kyiv, Ukraine). 
 Major League: Dmitry Chumakov (Odessa, Ukraine).
 Autumn-winter season of 2005.
 Junior League: Champion Andrey Ovsyannikov (Mirgorod, Ukraine). 
 Major League: Natalya Novikova (Izhevsk, Russia).
 Winter-spring season of 2006.
 Junior League: Champion Andrey Ovsyannikov (Mirgorod, Ukraine). 
 Major League: Champion Alexey Popov (Moscow, Russia).

When this season was over the generation change happened: The Major League left, Junior became Major and new Junior League was gathered.

 Autumn-winter season of 2006.
 Junior League: Champion Stanislav Shipachev (Kazan, Russia). 
 Major League: Champion Alexander Vetchinov (Kyiv, Ukraine).
 Winter-spring season of 2007. 
 Junior League: Champion Ruslan Samoylov (Kharkiv, Ukraine). 
 Major League: Champion Andrey Sidorenko (Yakymivka, Ukraine).
 Autumn-winter season of 2007.
 Junior League: Champion Andrey Boyev (Kursk, Russia). 
 Major League: Champion Valeriya Lazarenko (Kyiv, Ukraine).
 Winter-spring season of 2008. 
 Junior League: Champion Andrey Boyev (Kursk, Russia). 
 Major League: Champion Darya Tarasova (Nizhny Novgorod, Russia).

When this season was over the generation change happened: The Major League left, the Junior became the Major and new Junior League was gathered.

 Autumn-winter season of 2008. 
 Junior League: Champion Alexey Malyshev (Sevastopol, Ukraine). 
 Major League: Champion Stanislav Shipachev (Kazan, Russia). 
 Gold League: Champion Nikita Torzhevsky (Nizhyn, Ukraine).

After this season the Gold League added where high school students and usual students may participate. From the moment three leagues are: two participate in a season, but the one don’t.

 Winter-spring season of 2009. 
 Junior League: Champion Anton Okorokov (Bogoroditsk, Russia). 
 Gold League: Champion Alexander Vetchinov (Kyiv, Ukraine).
 Autumn-winter season of 2009. 
 Major League: Champion Ivan Sidorov (Cheboksary, Russia). 
 Gold League: Champion Andrey Voronov (Moscow, Russia).
 Winter-spring season of 2010. 
 Junior League: Champion Denis Galiakberov (Kazan, Russia). 
 Major League: Champion Ivan Sidorov (Cheboksary, Russia).

When this season was over the generation change happened: The Major united the Gold, the Junior became the Major and new Junior League was gathered.

 Autumn-winter season of 2010. 
 Junior League: Champion Oleg Gumenyuk (Moscow, Russia).
 Gold League: Champion Stanislav Shipachev (Kazan, Russia).
 Winter-spring season of 2011.
 Junior League: Champion Oleg Gumenyuk (Moscow, Russia). 
 Major League: Champion Arseny Lameko (Saint-Petersburg, Russia).
 Autumn-winter season of 2011. 
 Junior League: Champion Alexandra Nosatova (Belgorod, Russia). 
 Gold League: Champion Boris Belozyorov (Volgograd, Russia).
 Winter-spring season of 2012. 
 Junior League: Champion Alexandra Nosatova (Belgorod, Russia). 
 Major League: Champion Anton Okorokov (Bogoroditsk, Russia).
 Autumn-winter season of 2012. 
 Gold League: Champion Alexander Vetchinov (Kyiv, Ukraine).

When the current season was over, then generation change and game rules happened.

 Winter-spring season of 2013 (it aired in Ukraine only). 
 Junior League: Champion Pavel Ilchuk (Krasnogorsk, Russia).

Special editions

Participation of "The Cleverest Club" and their parents 
There were a few special editions of ‘The Cleverest’ in program history when season shows airing: 
 "The Cleverest Mom" (January, 2007). 
 "The Cleverest Dad" (January, 2007). 
 "The Cleverest: Romanticist’s League" (a pair game where the telecast finalists competed of 2006 season with the opposite gender partners, it aired on February 14, 2008) where winners were Violetta Skripnikova and Yury Yakovlev. 
 The cleverest parents and players: "Parent’s Day" (aired on September 7, 2008, and Gaponovs team won there). 
 "Together" is a pair game where the grand finalist of the Junior League and grand finalist of the Gold League competed (aired on September 6, 2009, and winners are Anton Okorokov and Andrey Yelishev). 
 "Teacher’s Year": players of "The Cleverest" show are competing with their teachers (aired on September 5, 2010, and winners were Boris Belozyorov and Lilya Bukayeva). 
 "The Champions Game": players that won grand finals of regular championships are competing here. It was aired on Inter on January 30, 2011, and on February 6, 2011, on STS. The winner was Valeriya Lazarenko.

Participation of irregular contestants 
 A few games held in 2003 where Russian and Ukrainian teams had participated. Round 1 consisted of two parts: Twelve Russians and Ukrainians were playing by turn and three contestants of each team had moved in Round 2. After that as in the current version, three contestants moved to the final game. There were played games such as "The Cleverest Teacher" (the winner was Boris Frolov, a Ukrainian representative) as well as "The Cleverest Teacher" (the winner was Alexey Bogoslovsky, a Ukrainian representative), "The Cleverest Doctor" (the winner was Alexey Bazhenov, a Ukrainian representative) and "The Cleverest Military Man" (the record of a game was on April 12 and aired on May 9, 2003. Leonid Vladimirovich Panyushkin, a Ukrainian representative won there.
 From 2002 to 2005 the special episodes were shown in an advertising block and the cleverest man was determined among four respondents. They had to answer the questions as more as possible in 20 seconds. There were both unusual persons and celebrities. In 2005 a comic episode, where Dmitry Nagiyev and Sergey Rost’s characters of "Caution! It’s Modern!" TV series were playing, was not been aired.
 In 2007 after similar cases the known persons had participated in "Kto khochet stat' millionerom?" (Russian version of "Who Wants to Be a Millionaire?") and "The Cleverest". In September 2007 in episode 1 of "Star Wars" actors of "Kadetstvo" TV series was participated and Kirill Yemelyanov won there. Alexander Berdnikov have won in the young singers game. Mikhail Malkin have won in an expert game of "What? Where? When?". Also, there was a game where the actual and former contestants of KVN was participated. Sergey Sivokho have won there. Some time there was "?????????i????" in Ukraine, it was hosted by Pavel Skorokhodko. Tina Kandelaki who was hosted "The Cleverest" had won in episode 1 of this project.

At present both these projects where irregular persons had participated, have not been airing.

 From July 24 to September, 2011 STS channel has released co-project with the Ministry of Defense of Russia named "The Cleverest cadet". The students of six pre-university educational institutions of the Military Department has participated: institutions of Moscow, Tver, Saint-Petersburg Suvorov Military Schools, the Kronstadt Sea Cadet Corps, the Orenburg Presidential Cadet School and Boarding female pupils of Moscow region of Russian Federation.

Contestants taken first and second places in the qualifying rounds have competed in the final game to be called as "the cleverest": 
 Ivan Kazayev from the Moscow Suvorov Military School took the first place, but Marat Mussov from the same place have taken the second place. 
 Alexander Yegorov from the Tver Suvorov Military School took the first place, but Yegor Faller from the same place have taken the second place. 
 Bogdan Khmilyar from the Saint-Petersburg Suvorov Military School took the first place, but Nikita Mikhailets from the same place have taken the second place. 
 Nikolay Fomin from the Cronstadt Sea Cadet Corps have taken the first place, but Kim Smirnov from the same place have taken the second place. 
 Sergey Karateyev from the Orenburg Presidential Cadet School took the first place, but Nikita Makarov from the same place took the second place. 
 Anastasia Varlamova from the boarding of female pupils of the Ministry of Defense of the Russian Federation took the first place, but Anastasia Borshcheva from the same place took the second place. 
 Alexander Yegorov, the pupil of the Tver Suvorov Military School, have won in the game series.

The cadet game was not been demonstrated in Ukraine.

Chronology of show air time 
 From March 8, 2003, the show aired in two channels: "STS" (Russia) and «1+1» (Ukraine)
 From March 8, 2003, to May 10, 2003, game show aired at 17.30 p.m
 From August, 2003 to January 7, 2004, game show aired on Mondays at 12.50/13.00 p.m
 From March 6 to November 6, 2004, game show aired on Saturdays at 13.00 p.m
 From November 13, 2004, to December 30, 2006, game show aired on Saturdays at 12.00 p.m
 From January 14 to July 8, 2007, game show aired on Mondays at 10.00 a.m
 From September 2 to December 30, 2007, game show aired on Mondays at 09.00 a.m
 From January 13, 2008, to June 21, 2009, game show aired on Mondays at 09.15 p.m
 From September 13, 2009, to December 31, 2012, game show aired on Mondays at 09.00 a.m
 From March 10 to June 23, 2013, game show aired on the сhannel Ukraine
 From March 10 to April 21, 2013, game show aired on Mondays at 14.00 p.m
 From April 28 to June 23, 2013, game show aired on Mondays at 07.10 p.m

See also
 Channel One (Russia) in Russia
 Inter (TV channel) in Ukraine

Footnotes

External links 
 The international portal of game and club "Brainiest" in Russian language
 Unformal web-site of game (till 2009) in Russian language
 Archive of old informal site of game (till 2005) in Russian language
 Site Celador, the founder of project Brainiest in English
 Official page on Ukrainian channel Ukrayina

1+1 (TV channel) original programming
Russia-1 original programming
STS (TV channel) original programming
2003 Russian television series debuts
2013 Russian television series endings
Russian game shows
2000s Russian television series
2010s Russian television series
Children's game shows
2000s Ukrainian television series debuts